The LAR Grizzly Big-Boar is a breech loading, single shot sniper rifle chambered for .50 BMG rounds.  It was developed by L.A.R. Manufacturing Inc., a gunsmithing firm headquartered in West Jordan, Utah.  The gun has been used in several Hollywood films, probably because its distinctive appearance and unusual loading method make it a memorable weapon.

Prices

As of 2020, the weapon and its multiple finishes are priced as follows:

Standard Blue: US$3,650.00
Parkerized: US$3,750.00 US
Standard Blue with Nickel trigger housing: US$3,800.00
Full Nickel: US$3,900.00 US
Stainless Steel barrel: US$4,000.00
 "LAR's official web page for the Big-boar, finishes"  Retrieved 1/19/2012.</ref>

Features
The gun has the following features:
 heavy barrel
Fully machined muzzle brake
Bolt stop safety
Thumb safety
An exchangeable AR-15 grip (Grizzly started out making high quality parts for M-16's)
Scope mount
Tripod pintle mount
Harris bipod

Specifications

The Grizzly "Big Boar" is a breech-loading, single-shot bolt-action rifle. It is chambered in .50 BMG (Browning Machine Gun) rounds. It has a barrel length of 36 inches. The Rifling twist is 1 turn in 15 inches. The weight of this weapon is 30.4 pounds without the tripod mount and scope. The overall length of this weapon is 45.5 inches. This weapon can be purchased from LAR chambered in either Match Grade or Field Grade Rounds.

Films

The LAR Grizzly Big-Boar can be seen in the following movies:

Tremors 2: Aftershocks (1996): Used by Burt Gummer (played by Michael Gross) to take out a single shrieker, a concrete wall, wooden beams, several oil barrels, an outhouse, and their escape vehicle, in a single shot. He states in the movie that it uses a "World War I Anti-Tank cartridge".
Tremors 3: Back to Perfection (2001): It is briefly seen several times until it meets its demise when Burt Gummer (played by Michael Gross) has to put an ammo can on his truck's gas pedal, propelling it off a cliff, so he and his friends can get away from a Graboid.
The Rock (1996): Seen briefly when Private McCoy's (played by Steve Harris) M60E3 runs out of ammo. He is knocked off the roof of the building he was on before he is able to use it. It has the muzzle brake removed.
Lost World: Jurassic Park (1997): The LAR Grizzly Big-Boar is used for the tranquilizer guns depicted in the film.

Legality
Owning a rifle that uses .50 BMG rounds is legal in most U.S. states, and some places allow the use of these weapons for hunting.

See also
.50 BMG

External links
  "LAR's Big-Boar web page"
  "The hunting Regulations page of North Dakota, stating .50 Caliber weapons with rounds not using smokeless powder can be used."

References

.50 BMG sniper rifles
Sniper rifles of the United States
Single-shot bolt-action rifles